The Federal College of Education (Technical), Gombe is a federal government higher education institution located in Gombe, Gombe State, Nigeria. It is affiliated to Abubakar Tafawa Balewa University and the University of Maiduguri for its degree programmes. The acting provost is Ali Adamu (Boderi).

College library 

The college library was established in 1977 with a collection of 500 volumes of books in the temporary site but was moved to the permanent site along Gombe-Bajoga Road in 1990. Presently, the college library is made up of a main library and virtual library. The main objectives of the library are to support teaching and learning through a developed and organized available information resources in the library. The library has 44 staff strength that manage the library. The current college librarian is Ishaya Dauda Marama.

Structure of the library 
The college Library has four sections for effective information services to the college students, researchers and lecturers which are:

 Administration Section: this is the college librarian division that  heads all the libraries by overseeing their affairs and reporting to the provost. The office is responsible for planning, managing, directing, monitoring and supervising all the activities of the library system.
 Technical Services Section: this is the collection development and processing of the information resources such as cataloging, acquisition and making ready available to users in the library.
 Reader's Service Section: in this section users like students and staff make use of available information resources such as consultation of books, borrowing and returning of books, documentation of students projects and reserve services are also provided by this section.
 Virtual Library Section: this section contain online and offline information resources. online and offline databases are all available in the section, since all information services are automated to save the time of the users with easy accessibility. the computers facilities are used for electronic examination, workshops, meetings.

History 
The college was established in 1977. It was originally known as National Technical Teachers College but was later named Federal College of Education (Technical), Gombe.

Courses 
The institution offers the following courses;

 Home Economics
 Primary Education Studies
 Mathematics
 Integrated Science
 Technical Education
 Woodwork Education
 Automobile Technology Education
 Agricultural Science Education
 Biology
 Computer Education
 Chemistry
 Biology
 Chemistry
 Business Education

Affiliation 
The institution is affiliated with the Abubakar Tafawa Balewa University to offer programmes leading to Bachelor of Education, (B.Ed.) in;

 Education & Physics
 Wood Work/Education
 Education And Chemistry
 Business Education
 Education And Biology
 Education & Mathematics
 Agricultural Science And Education
 Education And Integrated Science
 Home Economics And Education

References

Federal colleges of education in Nigeria
1977 establishments in Nigeria
Schools in Gombe State
Educational institutions established in 1977